This is a list of tequilas, including some of the many brands of tequila, both current and former. The year production first began is given when known. The Consejo Regulador del Tequila (Tequila Regulatory Council) reported 1377 registered domestically bottled brands from 150 producers as of November 2013. 285 additional brands from 34 producers are bottled internationally.

0–9

1519 Tequila (2013)
1800 Tequila (1975)
4 Copas
818 Tequila (2021)

A
Arette (1986)
Astral Tequila
Avión tequila

C

Camarena
Casamigos (2013)
Cabo Wabo
Casa Dragones (2009)
Casa Noble (1776)  
Chaya tequila
Cincoro Tequila (2019)
Corzo
Corralejo
Cruz Tequila (2005)

D

DeLeón Tequila (2008)
Don Julio (1942)
Dos Lunas Tequila (2006)

E

El Tesoro tequila (1990)
Espolon (1998)

H

Hacienda San José de Miravalle (1870) (defunct)
Herradura (1870s)
Hornitos (1950)

J

Jose Cuervo (1795)

K

 Kirkland Signature

L

Lunazul (2002)

M

Maestro Dobel Tequila (2008)

O

Olmeca Tequila (1967)
One With Life Organic Tequila (2015)

P

Patrón (1989)

R
Rey Del Mundo

S

San José Tequila
Santera Tequila (2015)
Sauza Tequila (1873)
Señor Río (2009)
Siembra Azul (2005)
Sol de Mexico Tequila (1950s)
Supremacia

T

Tres Agaves (2008)
Tres Generaciones (1973)

References

Tequilas
tequilas
+